Dato' Sri Wong Soon Koh (born 16 May 1942), is a Malaysian politician who has served as State Leader of the Opposition of Sarawak since November 2020 and Member of the Sarawak State Legislative Assembly (MLA) for Bawang Assan since September 1991. He served as the State Minister of Finance II of Sarawak from 2004 and State Minister of International Trade and E-Commerce from May 2017 to his resignation in July 2019, State Minister of Local Government and Community Development from September 2011 to May 2016 and State Minister of Environment and Public Health from 2008 to September 2011. He is a member of and has also served as 1st and founding President of the Parti Sarawak Bersatu (PSB) since 2015 and was previously a member of the Sarawak United Peoples' Party (SUPP).

Education
Wong graduated from the University of Western Australia (UWA) in 1968 with a Bachelor of Arts.

Political career
In September 2011, Wong was reappointed as Second Minister for Finance and reassigned as Minister for Local Government and Housing by Abdul Taib Mahmud.

In May 2014, Wong was sacked from Sarawak United Peoples' Party (SUPP), while still being SUPP Sibu branch chairman, by then-president Peter Chin Fah Kui. The party was reportedly unhappy with Wong's decision to appoint a number of community leaders. Soon before he was officially sacked, Wong announced in a hurriedly called press conference that he was joining a newly formed party, Sarawak People's Energy Party (TERAS), together with former Sarawak Progressive Democratic Party (SPDP) president William Mawan Ikom. Less than three months later, Wong announced that he was leaving TERAS to form a new party, United Peoples' Party (UPP), bringing with him three other elected state assemblymen.

In May 2017, Wong was reassigned by the sixth Chief Minister of Sarawak Abang Abdul Rahman Johari Abang Openg to head the new Ministry of International Trade and E-Commerce as UPP still being pro-Barisan Nasional (BN) party.

In late 2018, Wong's party, UPP, announced that it was changing its name to United Sarawak Party (PSB). In July 2019, Wong tendered his resignation as the International Trade and e-Commerce Minister and second Minister of Finance from the state Cabinet, marking PSB turning its status into Independent.

Personal life
Wong's spouse is Pauline Leong. Their only son Andrew Wong Kee Yew, suspectedly died of stroke on 10 February 2019 at their family home in Sibu. Andrew, former deputy chairman of Sibu Municipal Council, is married and has two children, a son and a daughter.

Election results

Honours
  :
  Member of the Order of the Star of Sarawak (ABS)
  Commander of the Order of the Star of Hornbill Sarawak (PGBK) – Datuk (1994)
  Knight Commander of the Order of the Star of Sarawak (PNBS) – Dato' Sri (2003)

See also

 Bawang Assan (state constituency)
 Parti Sarawak Bersatu

References

1942 births
Living people
People from Sarawak
Malaysian politicians of Chinese descent
Malaysian political party founders
Leaders of political parties in Malaysia
Sarawak United Peoples' Party politicians
Members of the Sarawak State Legislative Assembly
University of Western Australia alumni
Commanders of the Order of the Star of Hornbill Sarawak
Knights Commander of the Most Exalted Order of the Star of Sarawak
21st-century Malaysian politicians